The 2023 National Beach Soccer Championship was the inaugural edition of the National Beach Soccer Championship, an annual Beach soccer tournament in India organised by the All India Football Federation (AIFF).

Group stage 
AIFF announced schedule of this tournament on 24 January 2023. Later, Services has been replaced by Punjab. Also Manipur, who was initially drawn in group C, withdrew.

Group A

Group B

Group C

Group D

Knockout stage

Bracket

Quarter-finals

Semi-finals

3rd place

Final

Broadcasting
On 28 January 2023, All India Football Federation (AIFF) announced through twitter that, matches of knockout stage would be broadcast via official Facebook page and YouTube channel of AIFF.

See also
2022–23 Santosh Trophy
2022–23 Futsal Club Championship

References

External links
 

National beach soccer competitions
Beach Soccer Championship
Beach Soccer Championship
2023 in beach soccer
National Beach Soccer Championship
National Beach Soccer Championship